The World Tennis Challenge was a three night professional exhibition tennis tournament held in the week before the Australian Open in Adelaide, South Australia as part of the Australian Open Series. The tournament was created by a consortium of past players including Jim Courier, Darren Cahill, Mark Woodforde and Roger Rasheed And Alistair (Macdonald)It had four teams of two players, a 'legend' and a current player and are paired into areas e.g. Americas or represent their countries.  The current players play each other in a best of 3 match with a match tiebreaker for a 3rd set.  The legends play a pro set, and the doubles if needed is a normal set with no a rules before a super tie break if needed.

The event was first held in 2009 for an initial period of 3 years. 2

2009

Players and teams

2010
Played between 12 and 14 January.

Players and teams

Schedule
Tuesday Night: Australia v Americas and International v Europe

Wednesday Night: Australia v International and Europe v Americas

Thursday Night: Australia v Europe and International v Americas

Results
Results - Tuesday 12 Jan

Men's Singles (Current)

Stepanek def. Simon 7-6 (4), 6-0
Tomic def. Ginepri 7-6 (4) 6-4

Men's Singles (Legends)

Leconte def. Bahrami 8-5
Cash def. McEnroe 8-6

Men's doubles

Stepanek/Bahrami (International) def. Simon/Leconte (Europe) 7-5
Ginepri & McEnroe (Americas) def. Tomic & Cash (Australia) 6-7 (5)

Results – Thursday 14 January

CURRENT PLAYERS         
Bernard Tomic (291) def. Gilles Simon (15) 6-0, 6-7 (4-7), (10-6) 
Radek Štěpánek (13)  def. Robby Ginepri (96) 6-4, 6-0

PAST PLAYERS 
Pat Rafter def. John McEnroe 8-6
Pat Cash def. Henri Leconte 8-4

DOUBLES                            
Tomic/Cash def. Simon/ Leconte 7-6 (7-5)
McEnroe/Ginepri  def. Stepanek/Rafter 6-3

2011
Played between 11 and 13 January.

Players and teams

11 Jan
Australasia v Americas
Internationals v Europe
12 Jan
Australasia v Internationals
Americas v Europe
13 Jan
Australasia v Europe
Americas v Internationals

2012
Played between 10 and 12 January.

Players and teams

2017
The 2017 World Tennis Challenge ran from the 10th until the 12th of January 2017 as part of the Australian Open Series. The team names (Red, Blue and Gold) are based on the state colours of South Australia.

Players and teams

Champions

References

External links
 

Hard court tennis tournaments
Tennis tournaments in Australia
Sport in Adelaide
Exhibition tennis tournaments
Tennis in South Australia
Defunct tennis tournaments in Australia